Kuriidae is a family of crustaceans belonging to the order Amphipoda.

Genera:
 Kuria Walker & Scott, 1903
 Micropythia Krapp-Schickel, 1976

References

Amphipoda